Zalesie  is a village in Biała Podlaska County, Lublin Voivodeship, in eastern Poland. It is the seat of the gmina (administrative district) called Gmina Zalesie.

References

Villages in Biała Podlaska County